Saiqa is a 1968 Pakistani Urdu romantic film directed by Laiq Akhtar and produced by Shamim Ara. The film was based on Razia Butt's novel by the same name. 
The lead cast included Shamim Ara, Mohammad Ali, Darpan, Lehri, and Zamurrad. Saiqa won 9 Nigar Awards in various categories, including the "Best Film" of the year.

Plot
The protagonist of the film is Saiqa, a twenty-year-old orphan girl who lives in a palace with her grandmother, aunts, and uncle. The palace, however, is a horrible place for her because she is treated badly due to her parents' deeds. Her distant aunt Anjum Ara, who visits occasionally, and her uncle Fakhr, who doesn't overtly express his affection for her because of his wife, are the only people who truly adore her. 

Saiqa secretly loves her most annoying cousin Rehan, but he likes his other cousin. The superstitious adults with hate-filled hearts have misled Rehan and other kids in the palace into thinking that Saiqa's presence is a curse. Finally, Saiqa succeeds in convincing Rehan about her true love for him.

Cast
 Shamim Ara as Saiqa
 Mohammad Ali as Rehan
 Darpan
 Lehri
 Zamurrad
 Ragni
 Nabeela
 Sabira Sultana
 Nighat Sultana
 Talish
 Qavi
 Asad Jafri
 Shakir
 Chham Chham
 Klawati
 M.D. Sheikh
 M.A. Rasheed

Music and soundtracks
The music of the film was composed by Nisar Bazmi and the songs were written by Masroor Anwar:
 A Baharo, Gawah Rehna, A Nazaaro, Gawah Rehna — Singer(s): Ahmad Rushdi, Mala
 Aaja Teray Pyar Mein Hay Dil Be-Qarar — Singer: Runa Laila
 Husn Ka Jalwa Bijli Ban Kar Kab Kis Par Gir Jaye — Singer(s): Mala, Naseem Begum
 Ik Sitam Aur Meri Jan, Abhi Jan Baqi Hay — Singer: Mehdi Hassan
 Jo Hamguzar Rahay Hayn, Woh Zindagi To Nahin — Singer: Mala
 Teri Tasvir Mein Jo Baat Hay, Woh Tujh Mein Kahan — Singer: Mala

Release and box office
Saiqa was released on 13 September 1968.

Awards
Saiqa received 9 Nigar Awards in the following categories:

References

1968 films
Pakistani musical films
1960s Urdu-language films
Nigar Award winners
Pakistani romantic drama films
Films based on Pakistani novels
Urdu-language Pakistani films